Mohamed Sanad is an Egyptian antenna scientist and professor in the Faculty of Engineering, Cairo University.

He made contributions to antennas, and holds sixteen patents in the area. The most recent of which is  "Design of single and multi-band PIFA" (planar inverted-F antenna). He has also published thirty peer-reviewed papers or conference proceedings; the most recent are three papers at the IEEE Antennas and Propagation Society International Symposium (APSURSI), 2010, IEEE, He also worked with Nokia and Motorola on mobile phones.

IPA Prize Winning Project
A low-cost, lightweight, low wind-load, foldable/deployable, multi-broadband base station antenna has been developed using dual parabolic cylindrical reflectors with novel small size broadband resonant feeds invented by the applicant. The new base station antenna has the following 8 important advantages over the existing ones in wireless applications:
One base station can cover all wireless applications at different frequency bands including WiMax, digital TV, CDMA, GSM, etc.
The station is foldable/deployable and can thus be shipped and stored in a very compact form
It is very easy to assemble and disassemble
It has a low wind load
It is light
It can stand on the ground without mounting towers
It is low-cost and
It can generate beams of arbitrary angles in the horizontal and vertical planes.

Sanad received the Innovation Prize for Africa in 2012.

References

Living people
Egyptian scientists
Academic staff of Cairo University
Year of birth missing (living people)